was a village in Mine District, Yamaguchi Prefecture.

The village merged with three towns and villages in 1954 and the village dissolved. Currently the village is part of the city of Mine.

Geography 
The village was a farmland.

History 
 April 1, 1889 - Due to the municipal status enforcement, the village was founded within Mine District. At the same time, the villages of Nagata and Mana merged.
 1918 - Parts of the village of Ono in Asa District merged into the village of Managata.
 October 1, 1954 - The village merged with the villages of Ayagi, Akagō, and Ōda merged to form the town of Mitō.
 March 21, 2008 - Due to the merger, town of Mitō becomes the city of Mine.

External links 
 Mine official website 

Dissolved municipalities of Yamaguchi Prefecture